In military terms, 32nd Division may refer to:

Infantry divisions:
32nd Infantry Division (France)
32nd Division (German Empire)
32nd Infantry Division (Wehrmacht), Germany
32nd Infantry Division Marche, Kingdom of Italy

32nd Rifle Division (Soviet Union)
32nd Division (Spain)
32nd Division (United Kingdom)
32nd Infantry Division (United States)
32nd Division (Imperial Japanese Army)
Aviation divisions:
32nd Air Division (United States)

See also
32nd Regiment (disambiguation)